Taynton View() is a residential hub in Cheras, Kuala Lumpur, Malaysia. The former Taynton Rubber Estate was developed as a residential estate by N. Kamala Devi, a lawyer-cum-developer.

Roads
N. Kamala Devi named the roads after family members and friends. There are:-
 Jalan Nadchatiram (N. Kamala Devi's father)
 Jalan Dato' Haji Harun (N. Kamala Devi's long time friend)
 Jalan Bee Eng (N. Kamala Devi's secretary)
 Jalan Arasakesari
 Jalan Choo Lip Kung
 Jalan Lawrence Law
 Jalan Goh Boon Hong
 Jalan Tham Loy
 Jalan Dhana Pakia Devi (N. Kamala Devi's sister)

References

Suburbs in Kuala Lumpur